The women's 3000 metres event at the 1990 World Junior Championships in Athletics was held in Plovdiv, Bulgaria, at Deveti Septemvri Stadium on 9 and 12 August.

Medalists

Results

Final
12 August

Heats
9 August

Heat 1

Heat 2

Participation
According to an unofficial count, 25 athletes from 20 countries participated in the event.

References

3000 metres
Long distance running at the World Athletics U20 Championships